Stephensoniella may refer to: 

Stephensoniella (plant) - a liverwort (Marchantiophyta).
Stephensoniella (worm) - a genus of annelid worm.